Holy Cross Catholic Academy (or Holy Cross) is a Catholic high school. It was first established in September 1986 to serve western Woodbridge, a community in Vaughan, Ontario, Canada. The school currently serves grades nine through twelve (ages 14 – 18). In 1990, the school celebrated its first graduating class. Archbishop Robert Clune blessed the building on May 2, 1990. The school's tenth anniversary was inaugurated with the planting of a tree at the front of the school, which is marked by way of a metal plaque. Holy Cross Catholic High School was converted to a Catholic Academy in 1998 due to pressures from the Ontario government (Mike Harris' Conservative government) to enhance education in technical development. Its feeder schools include St. Peter's Catholic Elementary School, St. Clement Catholic Elementary School, San Marco Catholic Elementary School, St. Margaret Mary Catholic Elementary School, and St. Angela Merici Catholic Elementary School, all in the Woodbridge area.

Programs 
Holy Cross offers various student programs such as the International Baccalaureate Diploma Programme (IB), High Performer Athlete Program (HPA), and Specialist High School Majors (SHSM) in the areas of Arts and Culture, Health and Wellness, and Business.

Notable alumni

Frank Corrado, NHL hockey player; played for both the Vancouver Canucks and Toronto Maple Leafs
Steve Eminger, NHL hockey player; played for the New York Rangers
Marco Reda, professional soccer player; played for Toronto FC

See also 
List of high schools in Ontario
York Catholic District School Board
Woodbridge, Ontario

References

External links
 Holy Cross Catholic Academy High School website

York Catholic District School Board
High schools in the Regional Municipality of York
Education in Vaughan
Educational institutions established in 1986
1986 establishments in Ontario
International Baccalaureate schools in Ontario